Francesco Stifano Garzone (born 19 July 1979) is a Venezuelan football manager and former player. He is the current manager of Zamora.

Career
Born in Caracas, Stifano made his senior debut with hometown side Caracas in 1998. In 2003, after playing for Deportivo Italchacao and Marítimo de Margarita, he retired.

Immediately after retiring Stifano took up coaching, being in charge of C.S. Colegio San Agustín El Paraíso's youth categories. In 2009 he moved to Real Esppor as their youth manager, and was named first team manager in June 2013. A few months later, the club changed their name to Deportivo La Guaira, and on 31 October, he was sacked.

In January 2014, Stifano was named manager of Portuguesa, and won the 2013–14 Segunda División with the club before being dismissed on 30 September. The following 3 March, he took over Tucanes de Amazonas.

Stifano was appointed at the helm of Zamora on 6 June 2015, and finished the campaign as champions. He opted to leave the club in June 2017, and was named in charge of Deportivo Táchira in October.

Stifano left Táchira on a mutual agreement on 22 May 2018, and took over Zulia on 17 June. He left the club on 15 September 2019, and moved abroad on 12 December after being appointed Rionegro Águilas manager.

Stifano left Águilas in December 2020 after his contract expired, but returned to the club the following 3 March after the resignation of Hubert Bodhert.

Stifano was sacked by Águilas on 16 November 2021, and returned to his home country on 27 December to take over Caracas. He was dismissed by the latter on 19 September 2022.

Honours
Portuguesa
Venezuelan Segunda División: 2013–14

Zamora
Venezuelan Primera División: 2015

References

External links

1979 births
Living people
Footballers from Caracas
Venezuelan people of Italian descent
Venezuelan footballers
Caracas FC players
Deportivo Miranda F.C. players
Venezuelan football managers
Deportivo La Guaira managers
Portuguesa F.C. managers
Zamora F.C. managers
Deportivo Táchira F.C. managers
Zulia F.C. managers
Caracas FC managers
Categoría Primera A managers
Deportivo Pereira managers
Águilas Doradas Rionegro managers
Venezuelan expatriate football managers
Venezuelan expatriate sportspeople in Colombia
Expatriate football managers in Colombia
Association footballers not categorized by position